Goupata may refer to:

Goupata (mountain), a mountain in Argolis, Greece
Goupata, Arcadia, a settlement in Arcadia, Greece